This is a list of the mayors of the City of Bendigo, a local government area and the fourth largest city in Victoria, Australia.

Sandhurst Municipal Council (1856-1871)

City of Sandhurst / Bendigo (1871-1994)

Commissioners (1993-1996)

City of Greater Bendigo (1996-present)

See also
 City of Bendigo

Betty Jackman's book - Mayors of Bendigo  is probably the best public reference for the Mayors.

References

Bendigo
Mayors Bendigo
People from Bendigo
Bendigo